The word Quap might refer to:

 noun. a hypothetical nuclear particle consisting of a quark and an antiproton (found mainly in word lists, with little or no real usage)
 noun. "quap...it's the most radio-active stuff in the world. It's a festering mass of earths and heavy metals, polonium, radium, ythorium, thorium, carium, and new things, too." (Tono-Bungay (1909), H. G. Wells)
 Placename: Hon Quap (Cat's Tooth Mountain) southwest of Danang near My Son, Vietnam
 Placename: Cubitje Quap—a waterhole in the Kalahari Gemsbok National Park
 Acronym: Quality Program (QUAP) for photovoltaics and other sciences
 a small family remnant of Germanic-Celtic genealogical roots living in North America and NW Germany, the Quap (Quapp, Quappe) branch thought to be German, but possibly of Dutch and/or Mennonite (Anabaptist) derivation